The WorldChampion Jet (former Villum Clausen) is a fast passenger ferry built in 2000 by Austal, Perth, Australia. Until 31 August 2018, it was in active service between Rønne (Bornholm in Denmark) and Ystad in Sweden. On 19 December 2017, HSC Villum Clausen was sold to the Greek based Ferry Company Seajets. Starting from the summer of 2019, it was renamed WorldChampion Jet and started sailing between Piraeus and Cyclades.

HSC Villum Clausen was named after the 17th century Danish freedom fighter Villum Clausen (da). In 2000, it broke the world record for the longest distance travelled by a commercial passenger vessel in 24 hours.

Routes
World champion Jet operates daily from Piraeus to Cyclades:

Piraeus-Syros-Mykonos-Naxos-Santorini-Naxos-Mykonos-Syros-Piraeus

Fastest ferry in the world 
However the record did not last as in 2013 Austal's arch rival Incat, the only other shipbuilder producing large fast catamarans, built HSC Francisco, a 99 metre ferry with a top speed of 58 knots. It operates on the route between Buenos Aires and Montevideo.

Sister ships
 Adnan Menderes
 Carmen Ernestina
 Jonathan Swift
 Lilia Concepcion
 Tanger Jet II
 Thunder

See also 
 Auto Express 86-class ferry
 Povl Anker
 Hammerodde
 Leonora Christina

References

External links 
 Statische en actuele scheepsinformatie op marinetraffic.com
 Website van BornholmerFærgen
 Ferry-site.dk
 Ship-technology.com
 skibsregister.dma.dk (Søfartstyrelsen).
 Austal's press releases

Gallery

Ships of Seajets
Water transport in Denmark
Water transport in Sweden
2000 ships
Ferries of Denmark
Ships built by Austal